Sayyid Sirajuddin, commonly known as Siraj Aurangabadi (1715 - 1763), was an Indian mystic poet who initially wrote in Persian and later started writing in Urdu.

Work and Life 
The anthology of his poems, Kulliyat-e-Siraj, contains his ghazals along with his masnavi Nazm-i-Siraj. He was influenced by Persian poet Hafiz.

He had also compiled and edited a selection of Persian poets under the title "Muntakhib Diwan". The anthology of his poems, entitled Siraj-e-Sukhan, was included in Kulliyat-e-Siraj.

He stopped writing poetry at the age of 24.

In his later life, Aurangabadi renounced the world and became a Sufi ascetic. He lived a life of isolation, though a number of younger poets and admirers used to gather at his place for poetic instruction and religious edification.

His ghazal Khabar-e-Tahayyur-e-Ishq has been sung by Abida Parveen and Ali Sethi paid a tribute to the singer by singing the same ghazal in 2020.

See also 

 Muhammad Quli Qutb Shah
Wali Dakhni
Azad Bilgrami
Sikandar Ali Wajd
Urdu poetry
List of Urdu Poets

References

Further reading 
 The Encyclopaedia Of Indian Literature – Volume 5
 Encyclopedic Dictionary of Urdu Literature
 
 <

External links 
Kulliyaat-e-Siraj
History of Urdu poetry

Urdu-language poets from India
Indian male poets
Persian-language poets
History of Aurangabad, Maharashtra
1763 deaths
1715 births
People from Marathwada
18th-century Indian poets
Poets from Maharashtra
18th-century male writers
People from Aurangabad, Maharashtra